TNT Motorsports was a popular promoter of monster truck races, tractor pulls, and occasionally mud racing in the 1980s. TNT was an acronym for “Trucks n Tractors” founded by the late Billy Joe Miles of Owensboro, Kentucky. Events were shown on Powertrax on ESPN, Trucks and Tractor Power on TNN, and the syndicated Tuff Trax. In 1988, TNT produced 77 shows that it estimated drew 1 million fans. In 1989, the company had $12 million in revenue.

Series
TNT's truck and tractor pulling championship was sponsored by Red Man smokeless tobacco.  Champions were crowned in the four-wheel drive truck, two-wheel drive truck, unlimited tractor, super stock tractor, and pro stock tractor divisions.  Notable pullers were "The Professor" Dr. Wayne Rausch with his "Yellow Model T" and "Little Red Truck" two-wheel drives, "Full Pull" Pat Freels' "Cheers" t-bucket two wheel drive and "Dollar Devil" modified tractor, the Banter Brothers' several unlimited tractors, Tim Engler's "Mission Impossible" unlimited tractor, and the "Stitches" team of trucks owned by Jim Lyons.

Renegades tobacco sponsored the Monster Truck Challenge series, which became a championship (the first monster truck racing championship ever) in 1988.  Bigfoot, USA-1, Awesome Kong, Equalizer, Carolina Crusher, Night Life, and King Krunch were among the most competitive trucks, while Dennis Anderson and Grave Digger became the most popular truck on the circuit, sending them to eventual superstardom.

Only a handful of events would feature Pro Modified Mud Bog Racing.

Buyout
In late 1990, TNT was bought out by SRO/Pace, the promoter who at the time owned the competitor United States Hot Rod Association sanctioning body, and all former TNT events became USHRA events. Most vehicles continued to compete in the USHRA, however some monster truck owners, notably Everett Jasmer of USA-1, did not as they wished to only compete in open-qualifying races (as TNT was) rather than invitation-only events.

References

Monster truck promoters and sanctioning bodies
Defunct organizations based in Kentucky
Organizations disestablished in 1990
1990 disestablishments in the United States